Arno, Arn or Aquila (c. 750–821) was bishop of Salzburg, and afterwards its first archbishop. He preserved his voluminous correspondence from the scholar Alcuin of York.

Early years
He entered the church at an early age, and after passing some time at Weihenstephan Abbey, Freising, became abbot of Elnon, or Saint-Amand Abbey as it was afterwards called, where he made the acquaintance of Alcuin.

Carolingian Empire
In 785 he was made bishop of Salzburg and in 787 was employed by Tassilo III, duke of the Bavarians, as an envoy to Charlemagne at Rome. He appears to have attracted the notice of the Frankish king, through whose influence in 798 Salzburg was made the seat of an archbishopric; and Arno, as the first holder of this office, became metropolitan of Bavaria and received the pallium from Pope Leo III.

The area of his authority was extended to the east by the conquests of Charlemagne over the Avars for the Carolingian Empire, and he began to take a prominent part in the government of Bavaria. He acted as one of the missi dominici, and spent some time at the court of Charlemagne, where he was known by the assembled scholars as Aquila, the "Eagle". His name appears as one of the signatories to the emperor's will. He established a library at Salzburg, furthered in other ways the interests of learning, and presided over several synods called to improve the condition of the church in Bavaria.

Later years and books
Soon after the death of Charlemagne in 814, Arno appears to have withdrawn from active life, although he retained his archbishopric until his death on 24 January 821. Aided by a deacon named Benedict, Arno drew up about 788 a catalogue of lands and proprietary rights belonging to the church in Bavaria, under the title of Indiculus or Congestum Arnonis.

Many other works were produced under the protection of Arno, among them a Salzburg consuetudinary, an edition of which appears in Quellen and Erörterungen zur bayerischen und deutschen Geschichte, vol. vii, edited by L. Rockinger (Munich, 1856). It has been suggested by Wilhelm von Giesebrecht that Arno was the author of an early section of the Laurissenses majores, surviving in the copy at Lorsch Abbey, which deals with the history of the Frankish kings from 741 to 829; and of which an edition appears in the Monumenta Germaniae Historica, Scriptores, Band i, pp. 128–131, edited by G. H. Pertz (Hanover, 1826). If this supposition be correct, Arno was the first extant writer to apply the name Deutsch (theodisca) to the German language.

See also
Carolingian art
Carolingian Renaissance

References

Attribution:

750s births
821 deaths
Roman Catholic archbishops of Salzburg
9th-century archbishops
8th-century Latin writers
8th-century Frankish writers
9th-century Latin writers
Writers from the Carolingian Empire